Conco is a town in the province of Vicenza, Veneto, Italy, in the comune of Lusiana Conco. As of 2007, Conco had an estimated population of 2,272. Altitudine is 799 m asl in piazza.

Sources
(Google Maps)

Cities and towns in Veneto